Masters of War is the eighth and final studio album by American hard rock band Mountain, released in 2007. The album consists entirely of Bob Dylan covers.

Track listing
All tracks composed by Bob Dylan
 "Masters of War" (guest vocal by Ozzy Osbourne) 4:38
 "Serve Somebody" (guest lead guitar by Warren Haynes) 3:55
 "Blowin' in the Wind" (Heavy version) 5:37
 "Everything Is Broken" 4:09
 "Highway 61 Revisited" 3:27
 "Heart of Mine" 3:56
 "Subterranean Homesick Blues" 4:20
 "The Times They Are A-Changin'" (guest guitar by Warren Haynes) 4:59
 "Seven Days" 3:29
 "Mr. Tambourine Man" 5:31
 "Like a Rolling Stone" 3:29
 "Blowin' in the Wind" (Acoustic version) 3:56

Personnel
 Leslie West – guitar, vocals, arranger, producer
 Richie Scarlet – bass
 Corky Laing – drums, vocals

with:
 Brian John Mitchell – piano, organ, accordion
 Kenny Aaronson – bass
 Todd Wolfe – rhythm guitar
 Ozzy Osbourne – vocals on "Masters of War"
 Warren Haynes – guitar on "Serve Somebody" & "The Times They Are A-Changin'"

Additional personnel
 Doug Davis – executive producer
 Ben Elliott – engineer
 Chris Tsangarides – mix
 Dave Stephens – art direction & graphics

See also
List of songs written by Bob Dylan
List of artists who have covered Bob Dylan songs

References

External links 
 Mountain - Masters of War (2007) album review by Al Campbell, credits & releases at AllMusic.com
 Mountain - Masters of War (2007) album releases & credits at Discogs.com

2007 albums
Mountain (band) albums
Bob Dylan tribute albums